Brian Mills Turner is a former Democratic member of the North Carolina House of Representatives. Turner represented the 116th district (including constituents in western Buncombe County) from 2015 to 2023. On November 29, 2021, Turner announced that he wouldn't seek re-election in 2022.

Education and professional career
Turner earned a bachelor's degree in economics from Northwestern University in 1996 and a Master of Business Administration from the Babcock Graduate School of Management at Wake Forest University in 2010.

Before his election to public office, Turner worked as a television producer at MTV, as an executive at his family's manufacturing company, and as vice chancellor at University of North Carolina at Asheville. He currently works as a commercial real estate agent.

Political career
In his first run for elected office in 2014, Turner defeated incumbent representative Tim Moffitt in a hotly contested race. He has been re-elected a total of 3 times, most recently in 2020.

Electoral history

2020

2018

2016

2014

Committee assignments

2021-2022 session
Appropriations
Appropriations - Agriculture and Natural and Economic Resources
Wildlife Resources (Vice Chair)
Alcoholic Beverage Control
Education - Community Colleges
Environment
Marine Resources and Aqua Culture
UNC BOG Nominations

2019-2020 session
Appropriations
Appropriations - Agriculture and Natural and Economic Resources
Wildlife Resources
Alcoholic Beverage Control
Education - Community Colleges
Environment

2017-2018 session
Appropriations
Appropriations - Information Technology
Wildlife Resources
Education - Community Colleges
Education - Universities
Judiciary III

2015-2016 session
Appropriations
Appropriations - Agriculture and Natural and Economic Resources
Homeland Security, Military, and Veterans Affairs

References

External links
North Carolina General Assembly - Representative Brian Turner
Official Campaign website

Living people
Year of birth missing (living people)
People from Asheville, North Carolina
Politicians from Asheville, North Carolina
Northwestern University alumni
Wake Forest University alumni
21st-century American politicians
Democratic Party members of the North Carolina House of Representatives